The Art of Breaking is the third studio album by Christian rock band Thousand Foot Krutch that was released by Tooth & Nail Records in July 2005. The band diverges even farther from the nu metal from their past albums, omitting rap segments almost entirely in favour of a more traditional rock sound or traditional heavy metal elements. The single Move received moderate mainstream success, reaching No. 16 on Billboards mainstream rock charts in early 2006. The album has three singles: "Move", "Absolute" and "Breathe You In". Of these, only "Move" received a music video. The band has said that the girl on the album's cover is the girl in the video for "Move", as shown in a picture on their MySpace.

Track listing

Personnel
 Trevor McNevan – vocals, guitar
 Joel Bruyere – bass guitar
 Steve Augustine – drums
 Arnold Lanni – producer, mixing, recording, keyboards
 Ziad "Zee" Al-Hillal – recording
 Angelo Caruso – recording
 Kenny Luong – recording
 George Marino – mastering
 Sterling Sound – mastering location
 Phil X – guitar
 Harry Hess – additional background vocals
 Adam Gontier of Three Days Grace – guest appearance on "Hurt" and "Go"
 Brandon Ebel – executive producer

Awards

In 2006, the album was nominated for a Dove Award for Rock Album of the Year at the 37th GMA Dove Awards. The song "Move" was also nominated for Short Form Music Video of the Year.

References

Thousand Foot Krutch albums
2005 albums
Tooth & Nail Records albums
Albums produced by Arnold Lanni